EDP - Energias de Portugal (formerly Electricidade de Portugal) is a Portuguese electric utilities company, headquartered in Lisbon. It was founded in 1976 through the merger of 14 nationalised electricity companies.

History
EDP was founded as Electricidade de Portugal, E.P. by the Portuguese government though the Decreto-lei nº 502/76 published on June 30, 1976, merging 14 former energy companies that had been nationalised by 1975 in the aftermath of the regime change in 1974, of which the most significant had been the Companhias Reunidas de Gás e Eletricidade (CRGE). The Portuguese state privatised the company in several phases, from 1996 to 2011.

In March 2007 the group made a US$3 billion takeover of Horizon Wind Energy, the Texan-based wind power producer. At the time, it was the largest renewable energy deal to date and made EDP the fourth largest wind power producer in the world. The firm's renewables operations (including Horizon) are now contained within its majority-owned subsidiary EDP Renováveis, 25% of which was floated on the Lisbon Stock Exchange in 2008.

The company was ranked at position 239 in the 2009 issue of the Forbes Global 2000.

China Three Gorges Corporation, a SOE, won in December 2011 the bidding for the Portuguese government's 21.35% interest in the company.  The transaction is expected to be concluded by April 2012.  As of February 2014, just under 45% of the ownership of EDP was controlled by five institutional shareholders.  Amongst the others were the Qatar Investment Authority and BlackRock.

In late 2018 EDP's largest shareholder, China Three Gorges Corporation, proposed a hostile takeover of EDP. This was ultimately rejected at the shareholders meeting on April 24, 2019.

In 2020, EDP agreed to buy Viesgo, more than doubling its presence in Spain’s electricity distribution market.

Operations
The Group became the first Iberian company to own significant generating and distribution assets in both sides of the border, with a controlling position in the Spanish company HC Energía, and it is also present in the electricity sectors of Latin America – with a major presence in the United States, Brazil, Africa and Macau, in the generation, distribution and trading businesses.

The EDP Group's activities are centered on the generation and distribution of electric power, as well as the information technologies areas.  In addition, the group's business includes complementary and related areas, such as water, gas, engineering, laboratory testing, vocational training and real estate management.  It once had businesses in the IT consulting (Edinfor) and telecommunications (ONI) sectors, but these were sold, respectively, to Logica and the private equity group The Riverside Company.

In 2006 35% of the energy produced by EDP was from renewable energy sources, and, as of the end of 2007, the company announced that 39% of its energy was already emissions-free and that it was aiming for a 75% renewable energy production by 2013.

In November 2019 EDP announced that it had reached a 50/50 Joint Venture agreement with the French gas and power company Engie to merge their fixed and floating offshore wind power activities,  primarily targeting markets in Europe, the United States and selected geographies in Asia.

Foundation 

The EDP Foundation is a non-profit organization set up and financed by the company as a means to foster the development of cultural, scientific and educational activities. It is headquartered at Central Tejo, a former CRGE-owned 50 MW coal-powered plant at the Lisbon riverfront, decommissioned in the 1960s. Since 1990 it houses the Electricity Museum, recently incorporated in the broader MAAT – Museum of Art, Architecture and Technology, which is the main focal point of the foundation's activities.

Carbon intensity

See also 
 EDP Renováveis

References

External links

Energy companies of Portugal
Electric power companies of Portugal
Oil and gas companies of Portugal
Electric power in Portugal
Natural gas in Portugal
Companies based in Lisbon
Energy companies established in 1976
Non-renewable resource companies established in 1976
Companies formerly listed on the New York Stock Exchange
Portuguese companies established in 1976